This is a list of notable companies based in Iran. For listing criteria, see methodology section.

Current companies

*holding company

Methodology
Under a plan called "Top Iranian Companies" the 100 top publicly traded Iranian corporations are chosen each year based on 17 financial indices including growth in sale and dividends as well as rise in profits. In 2007 (1385), total sale of the top domestic corporations stood at over 868,200 billion rials. Sales of top 12 companies in the ranking constituted half of the total figure.

Iran Khodro has been named the top Iranian company. Based on financial 2007 statements, the giant auto manufacturer, Middle East's largest, has been chosen among 400 state and private companies. IDRO Group (IDRO), SAIPA, National Iranian Petrochemical Company and Melli Bank ranked second to fifth respectively. The most profitable companies as per financial statements for 2007 were IDRO, SAIPA, National Iranian Copper Industries Company and Mobarakeh Steel Company.

The ranking has been assessed by Iran Industrial Management Company for the past 13 years. In previous rankings, the top five corporations were IDRO with an asset of 112,658 billion rials followed by Iran Khodro with an asset of 65,971 billion rials, Iran Mining Industries Development and Renovation Organization with 52,184 billion rials, SAIPA car factory with 40,528 billion rials and National Petrochemical Company with 32,024 billion rials. The assets of the top 100 Iranian public corporations, which does not include major government owned corporations such as the National Iranian Oil Company and affiliated companies, Industrial Development and Renovation Organization of Iran (IDRO) affiliated companies, the Defense Industries Organization, Iran Air and the Iran Aviation Industries Organization, add up to $86 billion which is less than that of a corporation such as Microsoft.

In 2011, sales totals of the top 100 Iranian companies on the list ranged from $12.8 billion for the top ranking company, Iran Khodro, to $318 million for the 100th company. In 2012, total revenues generated by the top 100 companies stood at $160.6 billion.

For companies not listed in the top 100, see talk page for listing criteria.

See also

Economy of Iran
Bonyad
Setad
Tehran Stock Exchange
Privatization in Iran
Tehran International Fair
Science and technology in Iran
Foreign direct investment in Iran
International rankings of Iran
Institute of Standards and Industrial Research of Iran
Industry of Iran
Taxation in Iran
Technology startups in Iran

References

External links
 Iran Industrial Management Company - 2012 "Top 100 Iranian companies" updated list:
first page
second page in the listing
third page
fourth (final) page
 free online Microsoft translator
Tehran Stock Exchange Listed Companies (sorted by sector of activity)
List of top 100 Iranian listed companies - 2010 list by FinGlobe
Bloomberg (BusinessWeek) - Searchable database of Iranian and other international companies (with details including contact address and field of activity)
Iran Small Industries & Industrial Parks Organization
Iran Trade & Business Directory (including Exporters and SMEs)
Iran Business Directory - Ministry of Commerce (Iran)
List of Iranian Industry Associations
Ministry of Foreign Affairs - List of Iranian companies, associations and governmental organizations
Iran Industries InfoBase
KompassIran - Database of Iranian Companies (login required)
Iran Yellow Pages
 (Open directory)
List of 100 top Iranian brands

Iran